Herbert Pardes (born July 7, 1932) is an American physician, psychiatrist, and the executive vice-chairman of NewYork–Presbyterian Hospital.

He was the Dean of the Columbia University College of Physicians and Surgeons when he was selected to be the inaugural CEO of the merged Presbyterian Hospital and New York Hospital.  Dr Pardes retired in 2011 as CEO of the combined entity, NewYork–Presbyterian Hospital and assumed his current post.  He is a national figure in psychiatry and academic medicine.

Education and career 
Pardes received his Bachelor of Science degree summa cum laude from Rutgers University in 1956 and his medical degree from the State University of New York-Downstate Medical Center in Brooklyn in 1960.

From 1978 to 1984, he was the director of the National Institute of Mental Health (NIMH), where he strengthened the institute's research program and emphasized the need to increase research support for psychiatry.

From 1989 he was president of American Psychiatric Association (APA).

Pardes was chair of Columbia's Department of Psychiatry, where he remains a professor. From 1989 to 1998 Dr. Pardes was Dean of the Columbia University College of Physicians and Surgeons.

From January 2000 through September 2011 as president and chief executive officer of New York-Presbyterian Hospital and the New York-Presbyterian Healthcare System.

Pardes is also a member of Institute of Medicine, president of scientific board of the National Alliance for Research on Schizophrenia and Depression (NARSAD), a charter associate member of the National Depressive and Manic Depressive Association (NDMDA), and a regular advisor to National Alliance on Mental Illness (NAMI), the Anxiety and Depression Association of America, and Mental Health America Association.

Pardes was a member of the board of directors, audit and compensation committees of Value Line Incorporated (NASDAQ:VALU). Dr. Pardes was removed "without cause" from all Value Line committees and the board of directors April 16, 2010.

In 2008 Pardes received compensation of more than nine million dollars, along with other benefits.

On November 13, 2009, John J. Mack, chairman of the board of trustees, New York-Presbyterian Hospital, informed staff "that Dr. Herb Pardes has decided to retire at the end of 2011 as our President and Chief Executive Officer … While Dr. Pardes is stepping down as CEO at the end of 2011, the intention is that he will continue to play a vital role at the hospital beyond that time."

In 2014, the Brain & Behavior Research Foundation announced a new Pardes Humanitarian Prize in Mental Health would be named in honor of Dr. Pardes for his profound impact on the lives of people suffering with mental illness. The award is bestowed annually.

Personal life 
Pardes lives near the main Columbia University campus in the Morningside Heights neighborhood of Manhattan. He has 3 sons: Stephen, Lawrence, and James. He has a grandson named Zachary.

Bibliography 

A Look at Psychiatric Education, Herbert Pardes, M.D. Academic Psychiatry, 30:2,(98-99) March–April 2006
NIMH during the tenure of Director Herbert Pardes, M.D. (1978–1984): The President's Commission on Mental Health and the reemergence of NIMH's scientific mission.
Genetics and Psychiatry: Past Discoveries, Current Dilemmas, and Future Directions. Pardes, Herbert; Kaufmann, Charles A; Pincus, Harold Alan; West, Anne

References

External links
 New York Times Profile from January 2007

 "Columbia's Herbert Pardes Named President And CEO of New York Presbyterian Hospital", Columbia News, Dec 16, 1999.
 "Dr. Herbert Pardes Named to Markle Foundation Board of Director", New York-Presbyterian Hospital News, New York, NY, Mar 17, 2004
 "Value Line Form 10K SEC filing", April 30, 2009

American health care chief executives
American psychiatrists
Columbia University faculty
Living people
Psychiatry academics
1932 births
Rutgers University alumni
SUNY Downstate Medical Center alumni
Members of the National Academy of Medicine